The Montenegrin women's volleyball Cup (Montenegrin: Crnogorski kup za odbojkašice) is the national volleyball cup for women teams played in Montenegro. Inaugural season of Cup is held on season 2006-07, after the independence of Montenegro.

History

Before independence
Before 2006, Montenegrin Cup was a republic competition in FR Yugoslavia women's volleyball system. First season of Montenegrin Republic Cup was organized on season 1994-95. Winner of Republic Cup gained participation in the Federal Cup of FR Yugoslavia.

Most successful was Luka Bar, which participated twice in the final match of FR Yugoslavia Cup. First time, 1997-98, Luka Bar is defeated in the finals against Jedinstvo Užice in Belgrade (1:3). In their second final (2002-03), Luka Bar again met Jedinstvo, this time in Užice, and defeated 0:3.
In the period 1995-2006, winners of Republic Cup by seasons were: 1994-95 - Luka Bar, 1995-96 - Luka Bar, 1996-97 - Luka Bar, 1997-98 - Rudar Pljevlja, 1998-99 - Luka Bar, 1999-00 - Rudar Pljevlja, 2000-01 - Rudar Pljevlja, 2001-02 - Budućnost Podgorica, 2002-03 - Podgorica, 2003-04 - Rudar Pljevlja, 2004-05 - Budućnost Podgorica, 2005-06 - Podgorica.

After independence
Nearly after the Montenegrin independence referendum, Volleyball Federation of Montenegro founded its own national competitions. Women teams started playing in First League and Second League, and during the end of 2006 started the first season of Montenegrin Cup.
Cup Competition have two main phases. First are Round of 16 and quarterfinals, while second is final-four.

Winners and finals

Season by season
Since 2006-07 season, Montenegrin women's volleyball Cup is playing as a national competition, and in the finals so far played following teams.

Sources:

Trophies by team
Three clubs have won the trophy. The most successful is ŽOK Luka Bar, with 6 Cup-winner titles.

Luka Bar, also, participated in the two finals of FR Yugoslavia Cup (not counted in the previous list).

See also
Montenegrin women's volley league
Volleyball Federation of Montenegro (OSCG)
Montenegro women's national volleyball team
Montenegrin men's volleyball Cup

References

External links
 Volleyball Federation of Montenegro

National volleyball leagues
Volleyball in Montenegro
Women's sports competitions in Montenegro